Valley Stream Central High School is a public senior high school (grades 10–12) in the village of Valley Stream, New York on the South Shore of Nassau County. It is part of the Valley Stream Central High School District. Dr. Joseph Pompillo has been the Principal since 2001. According to U.S. News & World Report Central is the top performing High School in the District with the ranking of #103 in New York State compared to North's #138 and South's #131. Central has a graduation rate of above 95% and was recently recognized by New York State for having one of the highest graduation rates among men of color.

Performing arts program

Valley Stream Central High School is the only school in the Valley Stream Central High School District to house a performing arts program. The program, which is led by the District's "Fine and Performing Arts Department" director Adam Erdos offers students across the District grades 9–12 to take courses such as Theatre Arts, Dance, Voice Theatre, Dance Theatre, Acting, Musical Theatre, and Video Technology. The program is offered to students at Valley Stream North High School , Valley Stream South High School and Valley Stream Memorial Junior High School as well as Central students. To enter the program, one must fill out an application, which is provided on the District's website. Students from the other three schools are at Central for a portion of their day and then are either bussed or walk to their home school for the rest of their academic classes. The Performing Arts Program often puts on Dance Concerts and Showcases at Central's Bert Keller Auditorium, these performances are at night and are open to the public.

Career prep program

The Valley Stream Central High School District offers a wide variety of Career Prep Programs to its thousands of students, but similarly to Performing Arts, some of these programs are exclusively offered at Central. For example, Central is the only school in the district to house the Culinary Program and the Cosmetology Program. Other Career Prep Programs that students can take are Business and Technology classes and some Central students are a part of the Nassau County BOCES program, which provides vocational training at a different location.

Notable alumni

Richie Alan, drummer
Fred Armisen, actor and comedian
Bruce Blakeman, politician and lawyer
Sonia Blangiardo, producer, director
Stephen Boyd, NFL football player
Michael Brandon, actor
Jim Breuer, actor and comedian
Steve Buscemi, actor and film director
Conrad Cardinal, Major League Baseball player
Patricia Charbonneau, actress
Connie Dierking, NBA basketball player, Univ. of Cincinnati
Fern Fitzgerald dancer (Broadway) and actress (Dallas, Seinfeld)
Michael J. Garcia, Associate Judge, New York State Court of Appeals
Tom Gorman, MLB baseball player
Steve Hytner, actor
Phil LaPorta, football player for Penn State and NFL New Orleans Saints
Les Moonves, television executive & former CEO of CBS
Victor Ochi, NFL football player
Steve Orich Broadway orchestrator and composer
Vincent Penna, actor and voice talent
Edward J. Renehan Jr., Writer and publisher
Martin Rosen, writer, producer, director
Dom Starsia, lacrosse coach
Greg Smith, Bassist / Vocalist (Ted Nugent, Alice Cooper, Rainbow)
Martin Kove, American actor.

The Aquatones, 1950's Doo Wop group

References

External links

school's official webpage

Valley Stream, New York
Public high schools in New York (state)
Schools in Nassau County, New York
Magnet schools in New York (state)
1928 establishments in New York (state)